Robert Alexis Machado  (born June 3, 1973) is a former Venezuelan catcher in Major League Baseball who played from 1998 through 2004 for the Chicago White Sox, Montreal Expos, Seattle Mariners, Chicago Cubs, Milwaukee Brewers and Baltimore Orioles. Listed at 6' 1", 205 lb., Machado batted and threw right-handed. He was born in Puerto Cabello, Carabobo.

Machado was a solid defensive catcher with a strong arm, but his little offensive value limited his effectiveness as an everyday player. His most productive season came in 2001 with the Cubs, when he posted a .997 of fielding percentage and threw out 13 of 39 baserunners who attempted to steal off him. He also had eight multi-hit games, including three over a six-game span, when he went 9-for-23 with three doubles and a home run.

On June 9, 2002, the Cubs traded Machado to the Brewers for previously heralded prospect Jackson Melián.

Machado also played in all or part of 13 Minor League seasons spanning 1991–2004, posting a .273 average with 70 homers and 392 RBI in 862 games.

In February 2009, Machado received a 15-game suspension for violating MLB-Minor League drug treatment and prevention program while trying to return to organized baseball.

See also
 List of Major League Baseball players from Venezuela

References

External links
, or ESPN, or Retrosheet, or Pura Pelota (Venezuelan Winter League)

1973 births
Living people
Baltimore Orioles players
Baseball players suspended for drug offenses
Birmingham Barons players
Calgary Cannons players
Charlotte Knights players
Chicago Cubs players
Chicago White Sox players
Gulf Coast White Sox players
Iowa Cubs players
Major League Baseball catchers
Major League Baseball players from Venezuela
Milwaukee Brewers players
Montreal Expos players
Nashville Sounds players
Navegantes del Magallanes players
Ottawa Lynx players
Pastora de los Llanos players
Pastora de Occidente players
People from Puerto Cabello
Petroleros de Cabimas players
Prince William Cannons players
Seattle Mariners players
South Bend White Sox players
Tacoma Rainiers players
Utica Blue Sox players
Venezuelan expatriate baseball players in Canada
Venezuelan expatriate baseball players in the United States
Venezuelan sportspeople in doping cases